The following railroads operate in the U.S. state of Alaska.

Regional railroads
Alaska Railroad (ARR)

Heritage/scenic railroads
White Pass and Yukon Route (WPY)

Planned railroads
Alaska-Alberta Railway

Defunct railroads

Alaska Anthracite Railroad
Alaska Anthracite Coal and Railway Company
Alaska Home Railroad
Alaska Northern Railway
Alaska Pacific Railway and Terminal Company
Catalla and Carbon Mountain Railway
Copper River and Northwestern Railway
Council City and Solomon River Railroad
Golovin Bay Railroad
Nome Arctic Railway
Pacific and Arctic Railway and Navigation Company (White Pass and Yukon Route)
Seward Peninsula Railway
Tanana Mines Railway
Tanana Valley Railroad
Valdez, Copper River and Tanana Railroad
Valdez-Yukon Railroad
Wild Goose Railroad
Yakutat and Southern Railway

Industrial operations
Alaska-Gastineau Mining Company
Alaska-Juneau Gold Mine
Alaska Lumber and Pulp Company (Alaska Pulp Corporation)
Apollo Consolidated Mining Company
Cliff Creek Coal Mine
Coal Creek Coal Company
Cook Inlet Coal Field Company
Katalla Coal Company
Ketchikan Pulp Company
Maine Northwestern Development Company
Rush and Brown Copper Mine
Treadwell Mines

References

RailsNorth.com (2005), Rails to Riches. Retrieved January 5, 2006
The Katalla and Controller Bay Alaska Project (2005), . Retrieved November 22, 2006.

 
 
Railroads
Alaska